The Ladies Man is a 2000 American sex comedy film directed by Reginald Hudlin. The film stars Tim Meadows, who also wrote the film along with Dennis McNicholas and Andrew Steele. The film focuses on the exploits of radio host and sex therapy expert Leon Phelps, a character Meadows developed on SNL.

Plot
Leon Phelps (also known as the "Ladies Man") was a Saturday Night Live character played by Tim Meadows during the 1990s.  The sketch was that of a broadcast program in which Phelps, a young, suave black man, would give dubious romantic advice and lovemaking tips.  The Ladies Man openly proclaimed that he would court any woman at all including skanks, providing the woman weighs no more than 250 pounds.  A night of romance would generally revolve around a bottle of Courvoisier.

After finally going too far during a broadcast, Leon is fired, but he receives a note from one of his former flames who wants him to come back to her—and is willing to support him in high style. This sounds just fine with Leon, except that the woman didn't sign her name, and now Leon has to backtrack through his numerous conquests of the past and figure out who wants him to work his love magic. Meanwhile, a secret group called the Victims of the Smiling Ass (V.S.A. for short), consisting of the angry husbands and boyfriends whose women have cheated with Leon, have discovered Leon as their target and are now hot on his trail, eager to get revenge.

Cast

Box office
The film opened at No. 4 at the North American box office making US$5.4 million in its opening weekend.

Reception
The Ladies Man was heavily panned by critics. Rotten Tomatoes gives the film a score of 11% based on reviews from 73 critics, with an average rating of 3.2/10. The critical consensus reads, "The Ladies Man joins the growing list of mediocre movies based on SNL skits. It just doesn't have enough material to last the length of the movie." Roger Ebert gave the film 1 star out of a possible 4: "The character, with his disco suits and giant afro, is funny on TV--but then so are most of the recurring "SNL" characters; that's why the show recycles them. At feature length, Leon loses his optimistic charm and slogs through a lame-brained formula story that doesn't understand him."

See also
 List of recurring Saturday Night Live characters and sketches

References

External links
 
 

2000 films
2000 comedy films
2000s sex comedy films
African-American comedy films
American sex comedy films
2000s English-language films
Films directed by Reginald Hudlin
Films produced by Lorne Michaels
Films shot in Toronto
Paramount Pictures films
Saturday Night Live films
2000s American films